Laura Houghtaling Ingalls (December 14, 1893  – January 10, 1967) was an American pilot who won the Harmon Trophy.

She was arrested in December 1941 and convicted of failing to register as a paid Nazi agent, and served 20 months in prison. The Nazis had encouraged her to speak at events of the America First Committee.

Early life
Ingalls was born in Brooklyn, New York, on December 14, 1893, to Francis Abbott Ingalls I and Martha Houghtaling (April 7, 1865–ca. June 20, 1930). Martha was the daughter of David Harrison Houghtaling of Kingston, New York, who was a descendant of Jan Willemsen Hoogteling, who arrived in New Amsterdam on May 9, 1661. Laura wrote of her mother: "My mother, partly through ill health, was extremely emotional and without adequate self-discipline; spoiled by her parents who thought she was wonderful and could do anything. Brilliant along certain lines, she possessed the trait I find most exciting in the American character, viz. the ability to hurdle difficulties and achieve the reputedly impossible. I grew up under such influence."

She attended private schools in New York, and also studied in Vienna and Paris. She studied nursing at the Presbyterian Hospital Training School in New York. Quitting nursing, she danced in ballet and vaudeville.

Personal life
Laura Houghtaling Ingalls was a distant cousin of Little House on the Prairie'''s Laura Ingalls Wilder, and became a friend of her daughter Rose Wilder Lane.

Aviation
She learned aviation in 1928 at Roosevelt Field near Mineola, New York, and then continued at Parks Air College in St. Louis. By 1930 she was setting records in acrobatic flying.

Her best-known flights were made in 1934 and earned her a Harmon Trophy. Ingalls flew in a Lockheed Air Express from Mexico to Chile, over the Andes Mountains to Rio de Janeiro, to Cuba and then to Floyd Bennett Field in New York, marking the first flight over the Andes by an American woman, the first solo flight around South America in a landplane, the first flight by a woman from North America to South America, and setting a woman's distance record of 17,000 miles.

Aviation records
Longest solo flight by a woman (17,000 miles)
First solo flight by a woman from North to South America
First solo flight around South America by man or woman
First complete flight by a land plane around South America by a man or woman
First American woman to fly the Andes solo

Timeline
1893 – born December 14 in Brooklyn, New York
1928 – first solo flight, at Roosevelt Field, Mineola, Long Island (December 23)
1929 – enrolled in Universal Flying School at Lambert–St. Louis Field in June
1929 – obtained Limited Commercial license from Department of Commerce in September
1930 – obtained Transport license from Department of Commerce (April 12)
1930 – the only female in graduating class of Universal Flying School Transport course (score of 98/100)
1930 – established women's loop record in a D.H. Gipsy Moth over Lambert–St. Louis Field – 344 loops; previous record was 47 loops (May 4)
1930 – broke previous loop record at Muskogee, Oklahoma – 980 loops in 3:40 hr, in her D.H. Gipsy Moth (May 26)
1930 – established world barrel-roll record for men and women of 714 rolls over Lambert–St. Louis Field in her D.H. Gipsy Moth (August 13)
1930 – won third place Women's Dixie Derby from Washington, D.C. to Chicago, Illinois winning $800 in August and September
1930 – established first women's transcontinental round trip record between Roosevelt Field and Grand Central Air Terminal, Glendale, California. Time 30:25 to California; 25:20 on return flight to Roosevelt Field. Airplane: D.H. Gipsy Moth (October)
1934 – received 3rd Class Radio Telephone license with authority to use code (call letters KHTJQ) (January)
1934 – departed North Beach Airport, Jackson Heights, New York in Lockheed Air Express for flight to South America (February 28)
1934 – departed Miami for Havana, Cuba. Crossed the Caribbean Sea to Mérida, Yucatán; through Central America to France Field, Cristóbal, Panama (March 8)
1934 – departed France Field, Cristobal, Canal Zone (March 13), for nonstop flight to Talara, Peru, a distance of 1296 miles – 460 miles over water. Continued down the West coast of South America to Santiago, Chile
1934 – crossed the Andes at an altitude of 18,000 feet through the Uspallata Pass between Santiago, Chile and Mendoza, Argentina (March 21)
1934 – arrived in Trinidad and Tobago (April 17)
1934 – arrived in Miami, Florida (April 22)
1934 – arrived Floyd Bennett Field, New York completing 17,000 mile flight (April 25)

Activities as a German agent
In late September 1939, Ingalls flew over Washington, D.C., in her Lockheed Orion monoplane, dropping anti-intervention pamphlets. She was arrested for violating White House airspace, but was released within hours.
Following the defeat of France in 1940, she approached Baron (Freiherr) Ulrich von Gienanth, the head of the Gestapo in the US, and, officially, second secretary of the German Embassy. She suggested that she make a solo flight to Europe, where she would continue her campaign to promote the Nazi cause. Von Gienanth told her to stay in America to work with the America First Committee.

Ingalls gave speeches for the Committee in which she derided America's "lousy democracy" and gave Nazi salutes. Von Gienanth praised her oratorical skills. She had made a careful study of Mein Kampf, on which she based many of her speeches, as well as pamphlets by Hitler such as My New Order and Germany and the Jewish Question, and Elizabeth Dilling's books The Roosevelt Red Record and The Octopus. She expected Hitler to win the war; in April 1941, she wrote to a German official, "Some day I will shout my triumph to a great leader and a great people... Heil Hitler!" After the German declaration of war on December 11, 1941, she went straight to Washington to receive a list of contacts from von Gienanth, and was arrested a week later.

Ingalls was charged with failing to register with the government as a paid Nazi agent, in violation of the Foreign Agents Registration Act of 1938. She had been receiving approximately $300 a month from von Gienanth. During the trial it came out that von Gienanth had encouraged Ingalls's participation in the America First Committee, a significant embarrassment for that organization.

The FBI testified that they had kept her under surveillance for several months. Ingalls was convicted, and sentenced to eight months to two years in prison on February 20, 1942. She was transferred from the District of Columbia jail to the U.S. federal women's prison in Alderson, West Virginia, on July 14, 1943, after fighting with another inmate. She was released on October 5, 1943 after serving 20 months.

Prison had not altered her views, however. A few months after her release, she stated her opinion of the Normandy landings: 

After her probation ended, in July 1944 Ingalls was arrested at the Mexican border. Her suitcase contained seditious materials, including notes she had made of Japanese and German short-wave radio broadcasts. She was prevented from entering Mexico, but was not prosecuted. Ingalls applied for a presidential pardon in 1950, but her application for clemency was rejected by two successive Pardon Attorneys. On the latter occasion, the reply stated that Ingalls had been of "special value of the Nazi propaganda machine".

She died on January 10, 1967, in Burbank, California, aged 73.

References

Further readingNew York Times; May 4, 1930 "Laura Ingalls Makes 344 Loops in a Row; New York Flier Sets Record at St. Louis. St. Louis, May 3, 1930 (AP) Miss Laura Ingalls, 25 years old, of New York City, established a new women's record for consecutive loops in an airplane, executing 344 loops ... "New York Times; August 14, 1930 "Laura Ingalls Rolls Plane 714 Times"New York Times; October 6, 1930 "Laura Ingalls Flying To Coast For Record; Aviatrix Seeking Women's Continental Mark Reaches St. Louis After Take-Off Here"New York Times''; October 16, 1942 "No Laura Ingalls Parole. Board Rejects Plea In Case Of German Agent"

External links

Hargrave: Laura Ingalls

1893 births
1967 deaths
Aviators from New York (state)
Harmon Trophy winners
People from Brooklyn
People from Greater Los Angeles
Old Right (United States)
Aerobatic record holders
American aviation record holders
American women aviation record holders
Nazi propagandists
20th-century American women
20th-century American people
Non-interventionism